"Bigger Than My Body" is the first single released by American singer John Mayer from his second album, Heavier Things (2003). As a B-side, the single contained a cover of Radiohead's "Kid A" and an original song that was not included on Heavier Things, "Tracing". The intro to the song was generated using an Adrenalinn effects processor developed by Roger Linn.

Lyrics
John Mayer composed the song after going to a Coldplay concert. He wrote it to explain his desire to write both moving and great music, like what he found in artists like Coldplay, Stevie Ray Vaughan and Pearl Jam. At the same time, he commented on the frustration of not being able to get the music outside of his own body.

Critical reception
Chuck Taylor of Billboard called the tune "a pulsating midtempo pop/rocker ready to take center stage at mainstream and adult top 40."

Other versions
"Bigger Than My Body" was performed live on tour following the release of Heavier Things. In that tour, Mayer had several concerts recorded, four of which were then sold online on iTunes as "As/Is". "Bigger Than My Body" appeared on two of these releases, the California performance at Mountain View and the Texas performance at The Woodlands (and runs for 6:17, almost two minutes longer than the album and single version). The concerts were then compiled into a "best of as/is" CD, but "Bigger Than My Body" didn't make the cut. On Mayer's former website, an acoustic version of "Bigger Than My Body" was available to listen to using its music player, but this version has never been made available otherwise.

When played on the radio, the bridge was shortened for radio friendliness, like the bridge in "Your Body Is a Wonderland". Also, some radio stations cut out the end of the song as well.

Track listing
 "Bigger Than My Body"  – 4:26
 "Kid A"  – 2:52
 "Tracing"  – 3:18

Personnel
 John Mayer – vocals, guitar
 David LaBruyere – bass
 Jamie Muhoberac – keyboards
 Lenny Castro – percussion
 Matt Chamberlain – drums
 Greg Liesz – lap steel guitar

Charts

Release history

References

External links
 John Mayer plays "Bigger Than My Body" live in New York
 "Bigger Than My Body" lyrics, at Yahoo! Music
 "Bigger Than My Body" music video on YouTube

John Mayer songs
2003 singles
2003 songs
Columbia Records singles
Song recordings produced by Jack Joseph Puig
Songs written by John Mayer